Corbyn Dolley (born 26 November 1987) is a South African cricketer. He played in 42 first-class, 46 List A, and 20 Twenty20 matches from 2007 to 2015.

References

External links
 

1987 births
Living people
South African cricketers
Eastern Province cricketers
Griqualand West cricketers
Warriors cricketers
Cricketers from Port Elizabeth